The little grass frog (Pseudacris ocularis) is a species of chorus frog endemic to the Southeastern United States. It is currently the smallest North American anuran and occurs in a wide variety of ephemeral and semi-permanent wetlands.

Description
P. ocularis is the smallest frog in North America, only reaching a maximum head-body length of 19 mm (0.75 in). It is normally pale brown, but can have a green or pink tinge. This species is further characterized by a variable dark stripe which runs through each of the frog's eyes and down the sides of its body. The Latin term ocularis translates to "of the eye" in reference to this bold ocular stripe.

Habitat & Feeding 
This species occurs in a wide variety of ephemeral and semi-permanent wetlands in the southeastern Coastal Plain and favors grassy areas in and around cypress ponds and similar sites. It is commonly found on lower tree trunks and foliage up to a height of 1 m or more; males prefer these sites as calling perches. This species possesses the ability to rotate its head and neck more than other frog species, which is thought to aid in searching for prey or looking for a more suitable perch before leaping. The majority of food items consist of arthropods that are associated with leaf litter and/or soil—springtails, ants, thrips, palpigrades, etc. There has been some recorded research showing that adults have fed on large roaches, walking sticks, and mites.

Reproduction 
To gain a female's attention, males will remain perched on top of grass stems or tree trunks and call. This calling is most often compared to high insect-like chirps. P. ocularis The little Grass Frog breeds in shallow, fish free wetlands, including cypress domes, marshes, bogs, wet prairies, wet flatwoods, and floodplain forests  generally breeds from January to September in most of their range, but can breed year-round in Florida. Females can generally reproduce more than once per annual cycle. The eggs will usually be laid on a pond bottom or vegetation in shallow water. Females lay up to 200 eggs with 1-5 eggs per cluster. Eggs take 1–2 days to hatch and larvae take 7–70 days to metamorphose.

Behavior 
The little grass frog's call has 2 call components (pure tone followed by a train of pulses) which is unique in Family Hylidae. P. ocularis is often active both day and night and can be active year-round in some parts of their range. 

The little grass frog's have a few defensive mechanisms to avoid predation. Despite their small size, they can jump about 20 times their body length which can help them escape predators. Their coloration also provides them with a great advantage. They have a cryptic coloration similar to the vegetation in the areas in which they live. The dark stripes through their eye and along their sides are also thought to help break-up their outline to more visual predators.

References

  Database entry includes a range map and justification for why this species is of least concern

Further reading
Behler JL, King FW. 1979. The Audubon Society Field Guide to North American Reptiles and Amphibians. New York: Knopf. 743 pp. . (Limnaoedus ocularis, p. 410 + Plate 172).
Boulenger GA. 1882. Catalogue of the Batrachia Salientia s. Ecaudata in the Collection of the British Museum. Second Edition. London: Trustees of the British Museum. (Taylor and Francis, printers). xvi + 503 pp. + Plates I-XXX. (Chorophilus ocularis, pp. 333–334).
Collins, Henry Hill Jr. 1959. Complete Field Guide to American Wildlife: East, Central and North. New York, Evanston, and London: Harper & Row. xix + 683 pp. + Plates 1-48. (Hyla ocularis, p. 443 + Figure 114 and map on p. 444).
Conant R. 1975. A Field Guide to Reptiles and Amphibians of Eastern and Central North America, Second Edition. Boston: Houghton Mifflin. xviii + 429 pp. + Plates 1-48.  (hardcover),  (paperback). (Limnaoedus ocularis, pp. 326–327 + Plate 47 + Map 283).
Holbrook JE. 1842. North American Herpetology; or, A Description of the Reptiles Inhabiting The United States. Vol. IV. Philadelphia: J. Dobson. 138 pp. + Plates I-XXXV. (Hylodes ocularis, pp. 137–138 + Plate XXXV).
Wright AH, Wright AA. 1949. Handbook of Frogs and Toads of the United States and Canada. Third Edition. Ithaca, New York: Comstock. xxii + 640 pp. (Pseudacris ocularis, pp. 264–267, Plate LVI, map 18).

Chorus frogs
Amphibians of the United States
Amphibians described in 1801